Stavroula Samara (born ) is the captain of the a Greek group in rhythmic gymnast. She represents her nation at international competitions including Olympic Games, World Championships, European Championships and World Cups from 2009 - 2016.

She competed at world championships, including at the 2010, 2011,  2013, 2014 and 2015 World Rhythmic Gymnastics Championships.In 2015, she participated at the 2015 European Games in Baku.

She participated at the 2012 Summer Olympics in London.
She was part of the Greek rhythmic gymnastics team at the 2016 Summer Olympics in Rio de Janeiro.

Stavroula  Stavroula has given interviews to various national and international media companies in TV, radio and newspapers and has been a TV guest at a Greek Organization of Football Prognosis (OPAP) & ΛΟΤΤΟ and the national channel of Greece Sport 24 where she gave interview follwoing the 2016 Rio Olympic Games. In 2012 Stavroula gave an interview to BBC following their winning the bronze medal for the 2012 London Olympic Games. Following the 2015 World Championship, Stavroula gave an interview at the National Channel of Greece ERT3 and ERT1.

Stavroula has been awarded by the President of the Hellenic Republic Mr Prokopis Pavlopoulos at the Presidential Mansion and the Greek Parliament following the 2016 Rio Olympic Games. She has been also awarded by the International Olympic Committee, the Hellenic Club of Olympic Winners the UNESCO Goodwill Ambassador and president of her Foundation “ORAMA ELPIDA”, Marianna Vardinogianni, the Hellenic Olympic Committee, UNICEF Greece etc. 

Stavroula has volunteered with the Hellenic Olympic Committee to the Foundation “ORAMA ELPIDA” and the ELPIDA YOUTH SUMMER CUMP of Marianna Vardinogianni where distinctive personalities like the Princess of Greece and Denmark, Tatiana Blatnik, Marianna Goulandris and many more supported the event. She is also a mentor at the non-profit organisation “100 MENTORS” and has online speeches with students from all of the Greek community.

References

External links

https://database.fig-gymnastics.com/public/gymnasts/biography/14767/true?backUrl=
https://www.youtube.com/watch?v=r5iAQGQis08

1994 births
Living people
Greek rhythmic gymnasts
Place of birth missing (living people)
Gymnasts at the 2012 Summer Olympics
Olympic gymnasts of Greece
Gymnasts at the 2015 European Games
European Games competitors for Greece
Gymnasts from Thessaloniki
21st-century Greek women